Madhav Singha Dev(also known as Madhab Singha Deba) was the fifty-seventh king of Mallabhum. He ruled from 1801 to 1809 CE.

History
During his regime Ghatowal Mahal was auctioned. He was unhappy to live on the company's stipend. He tried to loot or rob the Bankura treasury and attacked it but failed and was imprisoned and he died in the jail.

In 1801, the kingdom was formally reduced to a Zamindari or a land-holding under the then king Madhab Singha Deba.

References

Sources
 
 

Malla rulers
Kings of Mallabhum
19th-century Indian monarchs
Mallabhum